Salim Muslumov Yanvar oglu (born 1 November 1961) Azerbaijani politician who served as the Minister of Labour and Social Protection of the Population (2013-2018) and the Chairman of the State Social Protection Fund of Azerbaijan Republic (2002-2013).

He was detained in February 2021 due to an ongoing investigation on state corruption.

Early life
Muslumov was born on 1 November 1961 in Pirhasanli village of Agsu Rayon of Azerbaijan. In 1983, he graduated from the Azerbaijan State Economic University cum laude. From 1983 to 1987 he continued his doctoral studies at Moscow State University. In November 1987, he obtained a PhD in Economics. From January 1988 until July 1995, Muslumov worked as professor and assistant dean at Azerbaijan State Economic University. From 1992 through 1995, he was also on research fellowship at Marmara University in Turkey.
Starting from July 1995, he was a department director at the Ministry of Finance of Azerbaijan Republic.

Political career
In March 2000, Muslumov was appointed Deputy Chairman of the State Customs Committee. On 17 January 2002 he was conferred the rank of General Major of the Customs. According to the Presidential Decree, he was appointed the Chairman of the State Social Protection Fund of Azerbaijan Republic on 17 December 2002.
During the General Assembly of the International Social Security Association held on 18 September 2004 he was elected member of bureau. He's an author to several legislative documents on economic policies which were then passed into law. Muslumov has authored 4 books and more than 50 publications.

Personal life 
Muslumov is fluent in Russian and English. He is married and has three children.

Muslumov was detained in February 2021 for corruption-related investigation about him.

See also
Cabinet of Azerbaijan
Economy of Azerbaijan

References 

1961 births
Living people
Government ministers of Azerbaijan
Azerbaijan State University of Economics alumni
Academic staff of the Azerbaijan State University of Economics